Diego Maradona (1960–2020) was an Argentine footballer.

Maradona may also refer to:
 Maradona by Kusturica, 2008 documentary film about the Argentine footballer
 Maradona (2018 film), a Malayalam film
 Maradona, the Hand of God, a 2007 Italian-Argentine biographical film by Marco Risi
 "Maradona (kesä '86)", a 2014 song by Teflon Brothers
 Estancia Maradona, a protected area in San Juan Province, Argentina

People with the surname
 Diego Sinagra or Diego Maradona Jr. (born 1986), Italian-Argentine footballer and son of Diego Maradona
 Esteban Laureano Maradona (1895–1995), Argentine country doctor, naturalist and writer
 Hugo Maradona (1969–2021), Argentine footballer, brother of Diego Maradona
 Raúl Maradona or Lalo Maradona (born 1966), Argentine footballer, brother of Diego Maradona

People with the given name
 Maradona Rebello (born 1986), Indian actor

People with the nickname
 The Maradona of Field Hockey is a nickname given Luciana Aymar (born 1977), Argentinian field hockey player

See also 
 Madonna (disambiguation)
 Church of Maradona or Iglesia Maradoniana, a religion, created by fans of Diego Maradona
 Diego Maradona (film), a 2019 British documentary film
 Estadio Diego Armando Maradona, a football stadium in La Paternal, Buenos Aires, Argentina
 Stadio Diego Armando Maradona, a football stadium in Naples, Italy, previously known as Stadio San Paolo
 I Am Diego Maradona, a 2015 Iranian film by Bahram Tavakoli
 Maradona by Kusturica, a 2008 documentary
 "New Maradona" or "New Diego", a nickname given to promising Argentine football players
 Peter Shilton's Handball Maradona or Peter Shilton's Football, a football video game
 Snorting Maradonas, a Swedish punk band